Harvest (stylized as HARVEST) is the second compilation album by Japanese singer Shizuka Kudo. It was released on December 6, 1989, through Pony Canyon, merely two months after the release of the album Karelia. Harvest features the singles "Koi Hitoyo", "Arashi no Sugao" and "Kōsa ni Fukarete", their B-sides, a few select tracks from Kudo's three studio albums released at the time, Mysterious, Shizuka and Joy, as well as a new song recorded and co-written by Kudo for the album.

Commercial performance
Harvest debuted at number two on the Oricon Albums Chart, with 144,000 units sold. It dropped three positions to number five the following week, with sales of 55,000 copies. It slid next to number six, where it stayed for two consecutive weeks, selling 39,000 and 65,000 copies, respectively. The album spent three more weeks inside the top ten and dropped out of the top twenty on its eleventh charting week. Harvest charted in the top 100 for twenty straight weeks, selling a reported total of 419,000 copies during its run. It ranked at number 23 on the year-end Oricon Albums Chart for the year 1990.

Track listing
All tracks composed and arranged by Tsugutoshi Gotō.

Charts

Certification

Release history

References

1989 compilation albums
Shizuka Kudo albums
Pony Canyon compilation albums